Georgi Viktorovich Movsesyan (2 August 1945 – 7 November 2011) was a Russian composer of Armenian descent.

Biography
Movsesyan was born in Kharkov, Ukraine, into a family of artists. He graduated from the Gnessin State Musical College in 1964.

A People's Artist of Russia (2001), he is mostly known for his songs "Beryoza", "Moi goda", "Olympiada", "Nachalo" performed by Iosif Kobzon, Lev Leshchenko, Anna German, Vakhtang Kikabidze and others.  He died in Moscow.

References

External links
 Biography 

1945 births
2011 deaths
Musicians from Kharkiv
People's Artists of Russia
Russian people of Armenian descent
Armenian composers
Russian composers
Russian male composers
Soviet composers
Soviet male composers
Burials in Troyekurovskoye Cemetery
20th-century Russian male musicians